National Highway 353J, commonly referred to as NH 353J, is a National Highway up to Four-Lane Highway in India. It is a spur road of National Highway 53. NH-353J traverses the state of Maharashtra in India.

Route 
Nagpur, Katol, Kalmeshwar, 
Jalalkheda, Warud, Morshi Chandur Bazar, Achalpur, Paratwada.

Junctions  

  Terminal near Nagpur.
  Terminal near Paratwada.

See also 

 List of National Highways in India
 List of National Highways in India by state

References

External links 

 NH 353J on OpenStreetMap

National highways in India
National Highways in Maharashtra